The men's 4x400 metres relay event at the 1996 World Junior Championships in Athletics was held in Sydney, Australia, at International Athletic Centre on 24 and 25 August.

Medalists

Results

Final
25 August

Heats
24 August

Heat 1

Heat 2

Participation
According to an unofficial count, 68 athletes from 16 countries participated in the event.

References

4 x 400 metres relay
Relays at the World Athletics U20 Championships